The Leers are a New Zealand alternative/indie rock band. The group released their debut album Are You Curious? on 4 March 2016.

History 
The Leers are a four piece alt/indie/pop band from Mt Maunganui who relocated to Auckland in 2010 to pursue their collective dream of being musicians. Their debut self-titled EP was released in 2011 and featured the hit single "Shame, Shame, Shame" which stayed in the bFM Top 10 for over five weeks (spending two of those at #1). Their first New Zealand Tour was in 2012 with Glass Owls and The Blind Venetians and saw them perform to sold out crowds in Auckland, Wellington and The Mount. Their second EP entitled Pockets, was recorded in their makeshift practice space over a weekend with recording genius James Dansey from The Sneaks. That EP spawned the single "Come With Us" which led to the band teaming up with Tom Furniss to create a hilariously bizarre cult themed video. The band followed Pockets with a double a-side single release recorded directly to tape at York Street Studios. That session was one of the last done there and was paired with two videos created by award nominated director Eddy Fiffield.

In 2015 The Leers went into Red Bull Studios to create their debut album. Engineered by Ben Lawson and produced by Sven Petterson of The Checks and Racing fame, Are You Curious? is the debut album from The Leers and showcases their tight sound and has been described as "an alt-junkies wet dream". The debut single from the album, "I Can't Cope" was a student radio hit and saw the band create their first NZ On Air funded music video with the god-like directorial force known as Thunderlips. The NZVMA nominated director used this as an opportunity to create a satirical take on indie/alternative music videos to hilarious result.

The Leers have supported such acts as Jesus Jones, Mini Mansions (featuring Mikey Shoes from Queens Of The Stone Age) and Harts.

Members 
 Matt Bidois - Vocals / Guitar
 Jacob Buchan - Bass / Backing Vocals
 Jack Furniss - Drums
 James Kippenberger - Guitar

References 

New Zealand indie rock groups